The 2022 Nepalese local elections were held on 13 May 2022 in 6 metropolitan cities, 11 sub-metropolitan cities, 276 municipalities and 460 rural municipalities. These were the second set of local-level elections to be held since the promulgation of the new constitution in 2015. From the local election result Nepali Congress has become  the single largest party of Nepal followed by CPN (UML) and Maoist Centre.

Electoral system 
Each local body has an elected head, a chair for rural municipalities and a mayor for municipalities. They also have a deputy head, a deputy chair for rural municipalities and a deputy mayor for  municipalities. Local levels are further subdivided into wards which have a ward chairperson and four members out of which two must be female with one of them from the Dalit community. The Chairperson/Mayor and a Deputy chairperson/Deputy Mayor are chosen by voters of the entire local level while Ward Chairperson and Ward Members are chosen by voters of the concerned ward. A single ballot is used for voting and First past the post electoral system is used to select the winner.

Qualification for candidates
According to Part 17 of the Constitution, a person who meets the following criteria is qualified to become a candidate for various elected offices of the local level:

 citizen of Nepal,
 completed the age of twenty one years,
 registered voters of concerned local level, and
 not being disqualified by any Federal law,

Survey and opinion poll

Exit poll

Mayor/Chairperson post

Results 
=== Overall Results ===

By province

Province 1

Madhesh Province

Bagmati Province

Gandaki Province

Lumbini Province

Karnali Province

Sudurpaschim Province

Major cities

Metropolitan cities

Sub-metropolitan cities

Incidents 
The Election Commission of Nepal sought clarification from CPN (Maoist Centre) chairman Pushpa Kamal Dahal and the wife of prime minister Sher Bahadur Deuba, Arzu Rana Deuba for violating the code of conduct during their election rally.

The chairman of the Muslim Commission Samim Miya Ansari was caught in Janakpurdham during the silence period of election campaigning for trying to buy votes for independent candidate Janakiram Sah and Surendra Bhandari, the chair of the Janakpur committee of CPN (Unified Marxist–Leninist) was also arrested for trying to buy votes. Ansari later accused UML leaders Raghubir Mahasheth and Julie Kumari Mahato of framing him.

During election day, the commission fined former prime minister Baburam Bhattarai NPR 15,000 for breaking the code of conduct by tweeting a picture of his ballot paper. In Vyas municipality in Tanahun, independent candidate, Deepak Raj Joshi, son of former Nepali Congress leader Govinda Raj Joshi, sustained injuries to the head after being beaten up by cadres of Nepali Congress. After clashes broke out between cadres of People's Socialist Party, Nepali Congress and CPN (UML) in Yamunamai Rural Municipality in Rautahat, a former police constable ran away with the ballot box in the ensuing chaos and voting was suspended. He was later arrested.

According to the National Human Rights Commission voting was suspended in different parts of the country due to clashes between supporters of different political parties. The Election Commission of Nepal reported that voting was suspended in 79 polling centres on May 13.

After accusations of booth capturing by CPN (Unified Marxist–Leninist) in Budhiganga Rural Municipality in Bajura, Nepali Congress demanded that a re-election be held. The Election Commission later agreed with the demands and a re-election was held on 7 July.

See also
List of chairpersons of rural municipalities in Nepal 
List of mayors of municipalities in Nepal
Elections in Nepal

Notes

References 

 
2022 in Nepal
Local elections in Nepal